WIPX-TV (channel 63) is a television station licensed to Bloomington, Indiana, United States, serving the Indianapolis area as an affiliate of Ion Television. It is owned by Inyo Broadcast Holdings alongside Bounce TV affiliate WCLJ-TV (channel 42, also licensed to Bloomington). WIPX-TV and WCLJ-TV share offices on Production Drive (near I-465) in southwestern Indianapolis; through a channel sharing agreement, the two stations transmit using WIPX-TV's spectrum from an antenna on SR 252 in Trafalgar, Indiana.

History
The station first signed on the air on December 27, 1988 as WIIB. Founded by the Sinclair Broadcast Group as their fourth television station after WTTE in Columbus, Ohio, WPTT-TV in Pittsburgh and flagship station WBFF in Baltimore and, to-date, the last station built and signed-on by Sinclair. It originally operated as an affiliate of the Home Shopping Network (HSN). Sinclair had planned to eventually convert WIIB into a general entertainment independent station. However, those plans were halted when Sinclair acquired the much more popular and established Bloomington-licensed station, UPN affiliate WTTV (channel 4, now a CBS affiliate), through its April 1996 merger with River City Broadcasting, with the company immediately focusing its efforts on that station and its Kokomo satellite WTTK (channel 29). In 1995, WIIB became an affiliate of the Infomall TV Network (inTV) infomercial service.

As Federal Communications Commission (FCC) regulations at that time had forbidden the common ownership of two full-power commercial television stations in the same market, Sinclair had to obtain a cross-ownership waiver from the FCC to keep WTTV/WTTK and WIIB. Channel 63 was sold to DP Media, a company owned by Devon Paxson, son of Paxson Communications and HSN founder Lowell "Bud" Paxson in 1998; around the same time, DP Media acquired low-power ValueVision affiliate W51BU and converted it into a translator of WIIB. On August 31 of that year, the station became a charter affiliate of Paxson's family-oriented network Pax TV (now Ion Television), changing its call letters to WIPX-TV to reflect its new affiliation. WIPX-TV and WIPX-LP became Pax owned-and-operated stations, when DP Media merged with Paxson Communications in 2000 (Paxson had earlier attempted to purchase WB affiliate WNDY-TV [channel 23, now a MyNetworkTV affiliate] for $28.4 million in 1997, before it was outbid by a $35 million offer from the Paramount Stations Group that October).

Newscasts
In September 2000, in conjunction with a joint sales agreement that Paxson had signed with NBC affiliate WTHR (channel 13), WIPX-TV began airing rebroadcasts of that station's 6:00 and 11:00 p.m. newscasts on a half-hour tape delay Monday through Fridays at 6:30 and 11:30 p.m. (the latter beginning shortly before that program's live broadcast ended on WTHR).

On February 28, 2005, WTHR began producing a half-hour prime time newscast at 10:00 p.m. for channel 63, which competed with the longer-established 35-minute prime time newscast on Fox affiliate WXIN (channel 59) and a half-hour newscast on WNDY-TV (channel 23)—the latter of which WTHR had produced for nine years before then-CBS affiliate WISH-TV (channel 8, now a CW affiliate) took over production responsibilities for the program after its owner LIN TV Corporation acquired WNDY. The news rebroadcasts ended and the prime time newscast was canceled on June 30, 2005, as Pax TV's news share agreements with network-affiliated stations were terminated upon the network's rebranding as i: Independent Television as a result of the network's financial troubles.

Technical information

Subchannels
The station's digital signal is multiplexed:

Ion Plus (formerly on channel 63.3) moved to WCLJ-DT1 upon Ion's purchase of the station in September 2018.

Analog-to-digital conversion
WIPX-TV shut down its analog signal, over UHF channel 63, on June 12, 2009, the official date in which full-power television stations in the United States transitioned from analog to digital broadcasts under federal mandate. The station's digital signal continued to broadcast on its pre-transition UHF channel 27. Through the use of PSIP, digital television receivers display the station's virtual channel as its former UHF analog channel 63, which was among the high band UHF channels (52-69) that were removed from broadcasting use as a result of the transition.

Former translator
WIPX-TV's signal was formerly relayed on translator station WIPX-LP (UHF analog channel 51) in Indianapolis; it maintained transmitter facilities on Walnut Drive in the northwestern portion of the city. WIPX-LP covered northern portions of the Indianapolis market that receive a Grade B to non-existent signal from WIPX-TV (including the cities of Kokomo, Marion and Muncie), though there was a decent amount of overlap between the coverage areas of both WIPX-TV and WIPX-LP's signals otherwise. WIPX-LP was a straight simulcast of WIPX-TV; on-air references to WIPX-LP were limited to FCC-mandated hourly station identifications during Ion Television programming. Channel 51 ceased broadcasting in 2013.

On December 15, 2014, Ion reached a deal to donate WIPX-LP to Word of God Fellowship, parent company of the Daystar network. The station is currently airing Daystar programming, and changed its call letters to digital-only WIPX-LD in 2015.

References

External links

Ion Television affiliates
Court TV affiliates
Scripps News affiliates
Ion Mystery affiliates
Defy TV affiliates
TrueReal affiliates
Television channels and stations established in 1988
1988 establishments in Indiana
IPX-TV